"After all… tomorrow is another day", is a quotation from Gone With the Wind, it is also the title of:

 Tomorrow Is Another Day (1951 American film)
 Tomorrow Is Another Day (1951 Italian film)
 Tomorrow Is Another Day (2017 film)
 Tomorrow Is Another Day (TV series) a 2014 Hong Kong TV series
 Tomorrow Is Another Day (album)
 "Tomorrow (Is Another Day)" a dance song by Canadian musician Marc Mysterio and British singer Samantha Fox 
 "Tomorrow Is Another Day", a song from Walt Disney Productions' 1977 animated musical film The Rescuers